Salvia engelmannii (Engelmann's sage, Engelmann's salvia) is a herbaceous perennial that is endemic to the limestone hills of central Texas. The flowers are pale lavender, growing on  spikes.

Notes

engelmannii
Endemic flora of Texas
Flora without expected TNC conservation status